Marco Bucci (born in 1959) is an Italian politician and former pharmaceutical manager from Genoa. He is the city’s mayor and its first right-wing mayor since 1975. He is popularly know as the "manager-mayor", due to the significant pragmatism which allowed him to gain the confidence of the Genoese people

Early life
Bucci graduated with degrees in chemistry and pharmacy from the University of Genoa in 1985 and worked in the chemical sector from the 1980s until the end of 1990s. From 1999 to 2016 he worked for Kodak and Carestream Health. In his career as a pharmaceutical manager, he worked at Ferrania (Savona), Genoa, Geneva and Rochester.

In the 2017 administrative elections, he was a candidate for mayor at the head of a center-right coalition composed of Lega Nord, Forza Italia, Brothers of Italy-National Alliance, Italy-Lista Musso and from the civic list Vince Genoa, with representatives of civil society and candidates of Popular Alternative who had decided not to present their own list.

In the first round he collected 38.80% of the votes, competing against the center-left Gianni Crivello (33.39%). In the second round of voting on 25 June he was elected first citizen of Genoa with 55.24% of the votes succeeding Marco Doria.

He is the first center-right mayor of Genoa since the introduction of the direct election of the mayor in 1975.

On 29 September 2017 he was elected President of ANCI Liguria.

References

1959 births
University of Genoa alumni
Mayors of Genoa
Living people